Telo de Mascarenhas (born 23 March 1899 at Mormugao Harbour, Goa 1899, died 1979) was a writer, a poet, a journalist and freedom-fighter from Goa.

Biography

In 1920 he travelled to Portugal to study, graduating in law from the University of Coimbra in 1930 (where he was taught by Salazar amongst others). During this period he founded Lisbon's Centro Nacionalista Hindu (in 1926) and the periodical Índia Nova (alongside Adeodato Barreto and other émigré Goan intellectuals). Through the 1930s and 1940s, Mascerenhas worked in the Portuguese judicial system, first in the Algarve and then in the Alentejo.

After India's independence from Britain in 1948, Mascerenhas returned to the Subcontinent and actively participated in Goa Liberation Movement. Although he spent some time in Goa, he was forced into exile and spent the years 1950-58 in Bombay. During his years of exile in Bombay, he published clandestinely Ressurge Goa, a political newspaper from 1950 to 1959. Returning to Goa in 1959, he was arrested, and the Portuguese rulers deported him to Portugal where he was jailed, first in Aljube prison and then in Caxias. Some years after the liberation of Goa he was released by the Government of Portugal in 1970 in exchange for the release of the Goan Padre Francisco 'Chico' Monteiro, who had been placed under house arrest by the Indian authorities for refusing to give up his Portuguese nationality.

On his return to Goa from Portugal in 1970, he founded the Círculo de Amizade Indo-Portuguesa (the Indo-Portuguese Friendship Society) and restarted Ressurge Goa as a cultural and political paper.

Works

Mascerenhas was a prolific poet in Portuguese and also did a Portuguese translation of the autobiography of Mahatma Gandhi and of many novels by Tagore.

Poetry in Portuguese 

Mascerenhas published two volumes of poetry: Poemas de Desespero e Concolação (Poems of Despair and Consolation, 1971) and Ciclo Goês (Goan Cycle, 1973).

Dois Poemas
As Sementeiras
A Primavera Chegou

Prose writing in Portuguese

Mascarenhas published an English-language autobiography, When the Mango-Trees Blossomed, in 1975. In it Mascarenhas claims to have written a novel and a novella during his incarceration in Portugal. The novel, Jogos Malabares (Malarbar Games), which he had to hide from the prison authorities, appears to have been lost. The novella was his Sinfonia Goesa, written in 1962 while Mascerenhas was imprisoned in Aljube gaol. Though it was never published in its entirety, several fragments saw the light of day in the post-Liberation Portuguese-language press. Some of Mascarenhas's writing has been published in English translation.

Crónica de Viagem a Bombaim

External References 
Bio entry on Mascarenhas
Obituary of Telo de Mascarenhas (in Portuguese)
Text by Mascarenhas recollecting his political past (in Portuguese)
Mascarenhas memories of the Liberation of Goa as accompanied from his prison cell (in Portuguese)
Poem dedicated to Mascarenhas by Eduardo Pereira de Andrade (in Portuguese)

References

Poets from Goa
1899 births
1979 deaths
Goa liberation activists
20th-century Indian poets
Journalists from Goa
Indian male poets
Indian male novelists
Portuguese-language writers
People from Mormugao
20th-century Indian journalists
20th-century Indian novelists
Recipients of the Padma Shri in public affairs
Novelists from Goa
20th-century Indian male writers